Gdaniec  is a village in the administrative district of Gmina Grzmiąca, within Szczecinek County, West Pomeranian Voivodeship, in north-western Poland.

The village has a population of 100.

See also
History of Pomerania

References

Gdaniec